Amir Bostaq (also Romanized as Amīr Bostāq; also known as Amīr Mūsa and Amir-Muza) is a village in Dowlatabad Rural District, in the Central District of Abhar County, Zanjan Province, Iran. At the 2006 census, its population was 233, in 49 families.

References 

Populated places in Abhar County